Njuh Venatius (born ) is a Cameroonian male weightlifter, competing in the 69 kg category and representing Cameroon at international competitions. He competed at world championships, most recently at the 2010 World Weightlifting Championships.

Major results

References

1988 births
Living people
Cameroonian male weightlifters
Place of birth missing (living people)
Weightlifters at the 2010 Commonwealth Games
Weightlifters at the 2014 Commonwealth Games
Commonwealth Games competitors for Cameroon
20th-century Cameroonian people
21st-century Cameroonian people